Liujiayao Station is a station on Line 5 of the Beijing Subway.

Station Layout 
The station has an underground island platform.

Exits 
There are 4 exits, lettered A, B, C, and D. Exits A and C are accessible.

External links
 

Beijing Subway stations in Fengtai District
Railway stations in China opened in 2007